Joseph Franklin Wilson (March 18, 1901 – October 13, 1968) was a U.S. Representative from Texas.

Early years

Joseph Franklin Wilson was born in Corsicana, Navarro County, Texas, March 18, 1901.

He attended the elementary school at Corsicana.  In 1913, he moved with his family to the Texas Panhandle community of Memphis, Texas  in Hall County.

Wilson attended the Memphis public schools until 1916.  From September 1917 to June 1918,  he was enrolled at Peacock Military College in San Antonio.  From September 1918 to June 1919, Wilson attended the Tennessee Military Institute.

In 1923, Wilson graduated from Baylor Law School in Waco, Texas and was admitted to the bar the same year.  Wilson moved to Dallas and began his law practice.

Public service

Wilson was a delegate to the Democratic National Convention in 1936.  He was chairman of the Dallas County Democratic Executive Committee 1942–1945.

In the 1946 Texas Congressional election, Wilson defeated primary opponent Sarah T. Hughes by 14,000 votes.  Hughes years later would administer the oath of office to President Lyndon B. Johnson aboard Air Force One on November 22, 1963.  Wilson defeated Republican L.W. Stayart in the 1946 general election.    He was re-elected in 1948 by defeating Joe Bailey Irwin.  In 1950 and 1952, Wilson ran unopposed for re-election.  Wilson was not a candidate for renomination in 1954.

Judicial career

Wilson served as district judge of the criminal district court of Texas in 1943 and 1944, being known as Judge J. Frank Wilson.  He was appointed judge of Criminal District Court No. 1, Dallas, Texas, in 1955, in which capacity he served until September 1968.  During the Jack Ruby trial in Dallas, Wilson was granted a vacation so that his larger courtroom could accommodate Judge Joe B. Brown for the Ruby Trial.   Wilson interrupted his vacation to fill in for the ailing Judge Brown.

Personal life

Wilson married Ruby Lee Hopkins in 1926.  The couple had a son Joseph Franklin Wilson Jr, and a daughter Marion Sue.

Later years and death

He retired due to illness and died in Dallas, Texas, October 13, 1968. His interment in Hillcrest Memorial Park.

References

1901 births
1968 deaths
People from Corsicana, Texas
People from Memphis, Texas
Politicians from Dallas
Baylor Law School alumni
Burials at Sparkman-Hillcrest Memorial Park Cemetery
Texas state court judges
Democratic Party members of the United States House of Representatives from Texas
20th-century American judges
20th-century American politicians